"I'm Just a Bill" is a 1976 Schoolhouse Rock! segment, featuring a song of the same title written by Dave Frishberg. The segment debuted as part of "America Rock," the third season of the Schoolhouse Rock! series.

Overview
The song is sung by Jack Sheldon (the voice of the Bill), with dialogue by Sheldon's son John as the boy learning the process. It is about how a bill becomes a law, how it must go through Congress, and how it can be vetoed, etc.

The Bill is for the law that school buses must stop at railroad crossings, likely a reference to the Gilchrest Road, New York crossing accident. In the song, the Bill becomes a law; in reality, such a bill has never been approved by the United States Congress, and indeed, such a bill would be of debatable constitutionality.

The song was covered by The Folk Implosion as "Deluxx Folk Implosion" for Schoolhouse Rock! Rocks in 1996.

In popular culture
The rap group Groove B. Chill sings the tune with new lyrics "We're Groove B. Chill/and we're sitting here on top of the hill" in their song "Top of The Hill" from their 1990 album Starting From Zero.

A few lines from Deluxx Folk Implosion's cover of the song can be heard in the 2003 movie Legally Blonde 2: Red, White & Blonde and is included on the film's official soundtrack.

In one of the commercials made by the now-defunct retail store Mervyn's as part of its renowned "Open, Open, Open" campaign, a woman and the Bill are waiting outside at one of the store's locations. An employee walks to the front to open the automatic door, but opens a smaller version of it for the Bill to enter, much to the woman's chagrin. At the close of this commercial, the woman wakes up as if it is a dream, while her child watches the "I'm Just a Bill" video on the TV screen.

The sketch was parodied in The Simpsons episode "The Day the Violence Died", in which Krusty the Clown presents "I'm an Amendment to Be", depicting a Constitutional amendment's attempt to ban flag burning. The sketch was later briefly parodied in another Fox produced animated series, Family Guy. In the episode, "Mr. Griffin Goes to Washington", an anthropomorphic legal bill sings on the steps of the U.S. Capitol Building until he is stabbed and stuffed into a garbage bag by a sanitation engineer. Jack Sheldon provided the voice of the amendment in both parodies.

The song was featured prominently in the Disney made-for-TV movie Mail to the Chief starring Randy Quaid.

In the February 12, 2006 episode of Inside the Actors Studio, when James Lipton asked Dave Chappelle what he wanted to hear when he arrived in heaven, Chappelle answered, "Congratulations, Bill, you're a law."

A Season 1 episode of the Knight Rider TV series, in which a senator requires protection after attempts on her life, is entitled Just My Bill.

At the end of another Schoolhouse Rock! song, Tyrannosaurus Debt (Money Rock), the Bill runs off after the tour guide says, "Feeding time is ALL the time!" This made Bill one of the only characters to appear on more than one of the main Schoolhouse Rock! cartoons. Mr. Morton & Interplanet Janet appeared in 2 direct-to-video episodes.

The Board of Education character from the Drawn Together episode "Foxy vs. the Board of Education" is a parody of the Bill.

In the January 16, 2011 issue of the comic strip Prickly City, Winslow, who is a long-time fan, discovers that the bill (in this case an oversized piece of legislation) likes to smoke and drink, and proceeds to tell Winslow that if he wants to get an autograph that he'll need to pay 100 bucks and has to be bribed with laundering money through political action committees. When Winslow reminds him of what the bill represents in the song, the bill's response was "I'm Just a Bill! A thirsty bill. Who's a guy gotta bribe to get a drink freshened up around here?"

The song was parodied in the Mad segment "GleeVR" where Garfield sings "I'm Just a Cat" which sounds similar to the song.

The video was referenced in Johnny Bravo: when Johnny walks past the Congress Building, he sees a bill sitting on the steps, just like the video. However, when they announce that the bill will not make it to the White House, a man comes out and destroys the bill with a flamethrower. Dee Bradley Baker provided the voice of the bill.

The Bill appears in the Robot Chicken episode "Robot Fight Accident", with a few other Schoolhouse Rock! characters (voiced by Seth Green).

The sketch was parodied in the opening sketch of Saturday Night Live on November 22, 2014. The bill, played by Kenan Thompson, is an immigration bill singing a slightly altered version of the song to the boy (Kyle Mooney). However, President Obama (Jay Pharoah) pushes the bill down the Capitol Hill steps several times while explaining to the boy that it is far easier to utilize an executive order (Bobby Moynihan), as a critique on Obama's frequent usage of executive orders during his term.

Stephen Colbert parodied the opening of the song in a segment on The Late Show on March 27, 2017 in response to the withdrawal of the American Healthcare Act in the US House of Representatives the prior week.

The May 16, 2017 episode of Jimmy Kimmel Live! featured an animated parody of the segment, titled "I'm Just a Lie", satirizing the Trump Administration's use of "alternative facts".

The fourth season premiere of Black-ish, ("Juneteenth"), which aired on October 3, 2017, included an animated parody titled "I'm Just a Slave", with the music performed by Aloe Blacc.

In January 2018, the character Bill was used in an editorial cartoon by syndicated cartoonist Greg Kearney dealing with the issue of the Kansas state legislature's use of anonymous introduction of legislation.

In October 2019, Homsar, a character in Homestar Runner, dressed up as the bill in the series' annual Halloween special.

In the Animaniacs 2020 reboot, Dot Warner throws the Bill into a printing press while singing about the First Ladies, in this case Rosalynn Carter and Florence Harding.

In March 2021, Southern Ohio Medical Center parodied the song titled "Just a Vaccine", which traces the path of a vaccine from development to distribution. It highlights the extensive testing undergone by COVID vaccines to make sure they're safe and effective, as well as explaining how vaccines work.

2007 reference to the cartoon in the United States Senate
Criticizing a comprehensive immigration reform bill, Sen. Jeff Sessions (R-AL) critiqued the proposed legislation for three hours on May 21, 2007 in front of "a giant picture of a famous scene from Schoolhouse Rock's 'I'm just a bill' skit." The caption on the picture was "How a Senate Bill Becomes a Law". Sessions pointed out how the reform bill had proceeded through the Senate in contrast with what educational material like the cartoon had laid out, saying "[Professor Hugh Hewitt has written that this is] Not what we were taught in grade school, I assure you, and I couldn’t agree more. This is not how the process is supposed to work. We should not be asked to trust our colleagues and vote to put a bill on the floor when we do not know that the bill text is even finalized, that the bill has not been drafted by legislative counsel, the bill has not been introduced or even given a bill number, the committee process was skipped and not followed, a Congressional Budget Office score may not have been requested."

References

External links
 

1976 American television episodes
Schoolhouse Rock!